Beth Goobie (born 1959) is a Canadian poet and fiction writer.

Life
Beth Goobie grew up in Guelph, Ontario, Canada. After working one year in Holland as an au pair, she spent the next four years earning a B.A. in English Literature from the University of Winnipeg and a B.A. in Religious Studies from the Mennonite Brethren Bible College, now Canadian Mennonite University. She then worked as a front line residential treatment worker in both Winnipeg and Edmonton.

Writing 
Goobie's first published poems were "To the Creator" and "The Making in Edges Literary Magazine in February 1987. Her work has appeared in many Canadian literary journals, including The Fiddlehead, Malahat Review, The New Quarterly, Antigonish Review, Event, Grain, Prairie Fire and The Prairie Journal. Her poem "Civilization lives in the throat" was selected by Giller Prize winner Souvankham Thammavongsa for inclusion in 2021 Best Canadian Poetry (Biblioasis).

As of 2017, she has 25 published books to her credit, including the genres of young adult fiction (18 books), children's (one book), one adult novel, 2 collections of short fiction, and 3 collections of poetry.

She lives in Saskatoon, Saskatchewan.

Awards
 1994 R. Ross Annett Juvenile Fiction Award for Mission Impossible.
 1995 Pat Lowther Award
 1998 Joseph S. Stauffer Award (Canada Council)
 2000 Canadian Library Association Young Adult Book Award for Before Wings
 2000 Saskatchewan Book Award for Children's Literature for "Before Wings"
 2003 Saskatchewan Book Award for Children's Literature for "Flux"
 2004 Saskatchewan Book Award for Children's Literature for "Fixed"
 2017 Saskatchewan YA Book Award for "The Pain Eater"
 2017 High Plains YA Book Award for "The Pain Eater"
 2017 Snow Willow Award for "The Pain Eater"
 2018 Saskatchewan Arts Board Book Award for Poetry for "breathing at dusk"
 2018 City of Saskatoon and Saskatoon Public Library Book Award for "breathing at dusk"
 2021 Carter V. Cooper Award

Works

Poetry
 
 
  Breathing at Dusk: Poems: Coteau Books, Regina, 2017
  Lookin' for Joy: Exile Editions, Holstein Ontario, 2022

Short stories
 
 The Only-Good Heart: Pedlar Press, Toronto, 1998

Adult Fiction
 The First Principles of Dreaming, Second Story Press, 2014

Young adult fiction
 
 Who Owns Kelly Paddik?: Maxwell Macmillan, Don Mills, Ontario, 1993
 Sticks and Stones: Maxwell Macmillan, Don Mills, Ontario, 1994
 Hit and Run: Maxwell Macmillan, Don Mills, Ontario, 1994
 
 Kicked Out: Prentice Hall Ginn, Toronto, 1995
 I'm Not Convinced: Red Deer Press, Calgary, 1997
 The Good, The Bad, And The Suicidal: Roussan Publishers Incorporated, Montreal, 1997
 The Colours of Carol Molev: Roussan Publishers Incorporated, Montreal, 1998
 The Dream Where the Losers Go: Roussan Publishers Incorporated, Montreal, 1999
 
 
 
 
 
 
 
 
 
 
 
 The Throne: Red Deer Press, Markham, 2013
 The Pain Eater: Second Story Press, 2016.

Young Adult Drama
 The Face Is The Place, Rave: Young Adult Drama: Blizzard Publishing, Winnipeg, 2000

Children's Novel
 Jason's Why: Red Deer Press, Markham, 2013

References

External links

"Beth Goobie's otherworldly views", Quill & Quire, Amy Jo Ehman, May 2004
 
 

1960 births
Canadian children's writers
Canadian science fiction writers
20th-century Canadian novelists
20th-century Canadian poets
21st-century Canadian novelists
21st-century Canadian poets
People from Guelph
University of Winnipeg alumni
Writers from Ontario
Writers from Saskatoon
Canadian women novelists
Canadian women poets
Canadian women short story writers
20th-century Canadian women writers
21st-century Canadian women writers
Living people
20th-century Canadian short story writers
21st-century Canadian short story writers
Women science fiction and fantasy writers
Mennonite writers
Mennonite poets